The Anglican Diocese of Ughelli is one of 11 within the Anglican Province of Bendel, itself one of 14 provinces within the Church of Nigeria. The current bishop is Cyril Odutemu, who in 2020 became Archbishop of the Province.

Notes

Church of Nigeria dioceses
Dioceses of the Province of Bendel